Detroit was a 6-gun brig launched in 1798 as Adams in the United States. During the War of 1812 the British captured her, renamed her, and took her into the Provincial Marine. She served on Lake Erie during the War of 1812, giving the British control of the lake. The Americans briefly recaptured her, but she grounded and came under heavy fire. The Americans had to abandon her. The vessel was set afire and burnt.

Description and construction
Shortly after General Anthony Wayne took control of Detroit in 1796, a ship was ordered for construction by the United States Army. Construction of the 125-tons burthen vessel at the United States Shipyard on the River Rouge (at Baby Creek near what is now Woodmere Cemetery) began in 1797. Some accounts of the vessel indicate that the process of salting for preservation of the wood used in the construction was utilized aboard Adams. However, the process was done incorrectly and in a refit performed ten years after the brig's construction, it was found that the salt had been packed too tightly and had not dissolved into the wood, and remained hard and dry between the frames. The United States Army intended to use Adams as a transport vessel carrying supplies between American outposts on the upper Great Lakes including Fort Mackinac on Lake Huron. The vessel was also used to carry private cargo.

Service history
By the beginning of the War of 1812, Adams was the only American government vessel of any kind on the upper Great Lakes. Adams was armed with six  cannon and operated out of Detroit. On 16 August 1812, General William Hull surrendered Detroit after a siege by British forces. Adams, which had been at Detroit, was surrendered too, and was taken into Provincial Marine service and renamed Detroit. The brig was added to the Provincial Marine's Lake Erie squadron. However, Detroits British service was short lived.

On 8 October, Detroit, with the North West Company's brig , was anchored off Fort Erie. Lieutenant Jesse Elliott, commander of the United States Navy forces on Lake Erie, spotted the vessels and commanded a cutting out operation to capture both brigs. The American force of 100 departed Buffalo Creek and approached the British vessels in darkness. Elliott's force successfully captured both vessels and the Americans made for safe harbour at Black Rock. Caledonia arrived safely, but Detroit ran aground on the southern tip of Squaw Island after the wind had died and the vessel became unmanageable, while under fire from British artillery. The British sent a force to retake the ship, but Elliott's crew beat off the attack. In order to prevent the brig's recapture, Elliott ordered the ship burned.

See also
 Bibliography of 18th–19th century Royal Naval history
 List of ships captured in the 19th century

Notes

Citations

References
 
 
 

Brigs of the Royal Navy
War of 1812 ships of the United Kingdom
Adams
1799 ships
Ships built in Detroit
Captured ships
Ships named for Founding Fathers of the United States
Provincial Marine